The Greene County Airport  is a county-owned, public-use airport in Franklin Township, Greene County, Pennsylvania, United States. It is located two nautical miles (4 km) east of the central business district of Waynesburg, Pennsylvania. This airport was included in the National Plan of Integrated Airport Systems for 2009–2013, which categorized it as a general aviation facility.

Facilities and aircraft 
Greene County Airport covers an area of 89 acres (36 ha) at an elevation of 1,069 feet (326 m) above mean sea level. It has one runway designated 9/27 with an asphalt surface measuring 3,500 by 75 feet (1,067 x 23 m).

For the twelve-month period ending April 21, 2011, the airport had 13,909 aircraft operations, an average of 38 per day: 99% general aviation, 1% air taxi, and <1% military. At that time, there were 25 aircraft based at this airport: 96% single-engine and 4% ultralight.

References

External links 
 Greene County Airport Administration
 Greene County Airport at PennDOT Airport Directory
 Aerial image as of April 1993 from USGS The National Map
 

Airports in Pennsylvania
County airports in Pennsylvania
Transportation buildings and structures in Greene County, Pennsylvania